For the city in Arkansas named Southside, see Southside, Independence County, Arkansas.

Southside is an unincorporated community located in Van Buren County, Arkansas. Its zip code is 78420.

References

Unincorporated communities in Arkansas
Unincorporated communities in Van Buren County, Arkansas